Myrica  is a genus of about 35–50 species of small trees and shrubs in the family Myricaceae, order Fagales. The genus has a wide distribution, including Africa, Asia, Europe, North America and South America, and missing only from Australia. Some botanists split the genus into two genera on the basis of the catkin and fruit structure, restricting Myrica to a few species, and treating the others in Morella.

Common names include bayberry, bay-rum tree, candleberry, sweet gale, and wax-myrtle. The generic name was derived from the Greek word μυρίκη (myrike), meaning "fragrance".

Characteristics

The species vary from 1m shrubs up to 20m trees; some are deciduous, but the majority of species are evergreen. The roots have nitrogen-fixing bacteria which enable the plants to grow on soils that are very poor in nitrogen content. The leaves are spirally arranged, simple, 2–12 cm long, oblanceolate with a tapered base and broader tip, and a crinkled or finely toothed margin. The flowers are catkins, with male and female catkins usually on separate plants (dioecious). The fruit is a small drupe, usually with a wax coating.

The type species, Myrica gale, is holarctic in distribution, growing in acidic peat bogs throughout the colder parts of the Northern Hemisphere; it is a deciduous shrub growing to 1m tall. The remaining species all have relatively small ranges, and are mostly warm-temperate.

Myrica faya (Morella faya), native to the volcanic islands of the Azores, Madeira and the Canary Islands, has become an invasive species on the Hawaiian volcanoes where it was introduced in the 19th century; its ability to fix nitrogen makes it very well adapted to growing on low-nitrogen volcanic soils.

The wax coating on the fruit is indigestible for most birds, but a few species have adapted to be able to eat it, notably the yellow-rumped warbler and tree swallow in North America. As the wax is very energy-rich, this enables the yellow-rumped warbler to winter farther north in cooler climates than any other American warbler if bayberries are present. The seeds are then dispersed in the droppings of the birds. 

Myrica species are used as food plants by the larvae of some Lepidoptera species including brown-tail, emperor moth, and winter moth as well as the bucculatricid leaf-miners Bucculatrix cidarella, B. myricae (feeds exclusively on M. gale) and B. paroptila and the Coleophora case-bearers C. comptoniella, C. pruniella, and C. viminetella.

Uses
Native Americans used bayberry medicinally. The root bark was pounded into powder and mixed with water to cure diarrhea. American pioneers sniffed the powder to counter nasal congestion. It was sometimes used in poultices.

The wax coating on the fruit of several species, known as bayberry wax, has been used traditionally to make candles. It was used for that purpose by the Robinson family in the novel The Swiss Family Robinson. The foliage of Myrica gale is a traditional insect repellent, used by campers to keep biting insects out of tents. Several species are also grown as ornamental plants in gardens. The fruit of Myrica rubra is an economically important crop in China, sold fresh, dried, canned, for juice, for flavoring in snacks, and for alcoholic beverages. Myrica is used to spice beer and snaps in Denmark.

The leaves can add flavor to soups and broths. They can be dried and stored in jars to be used as a spice.

Species
Myrica comprises the following species:

Myrica adenophora Hance
Myrica arborea Hutch.
Myrica brevifolia E. Mey. ex C. DC.
Myrica cacuminis Britton & P.Wilson
Myrica californica Cham. & Schltdl. – California bayberry
Myrica caroliniensis  Mill. southern bayberry
Myrica cerifera L. – wax-myrtle, southern wax-myrtle
Myrica chevalieri (Parra-Os.) Christenh. & Byng
Myrica chimanimaniana (Verdc. & Polhill) Christenh. & Byng
Myrica cordifolia L.
Myrica dentulata Baill.
Myrica diversifolia Adamson
Myrica esculenta Buch.-Ham. ex D.Don
Myrica faya Aiton – faya bayberry
Myrica funckii A.Chev.
Myrica gale L. – sweet gale or bog-myrtle
Myrica goetzei Engl.
Myrica hartwegii S.Watson – Sierra bayberry
Myrica heterophylla Raf.
Myrica holdridgeana Lundell
Myrica humilis Cham.
Myrica inodora W.Bartram – scentless bayberry
Myrica integra (A.Chev.) Killick
Myrica integrifolia Roxb.
Myrica interrupta Benth.
Myrica javanica Blume
Myrica kandtiana Engl.
Myrica kilimandscharica Engl.
Myrica kraussiana Buchinger ex Meisn.
Myrica lindeniana C.DC.
Myrica meyeri-johannis Engl.
Myrica microbracteata Weim.
Myrica mildbraedii Engl.
Myrica nana A.Chev.
Myrica parvifolia Benth.
Myrica pavonis C.DC.
Myrica pensylvanica Mirb. – northern bayberry
Myrica phanerodonta Standl.
Myrica picardae Krug & Urb.
Myrica pilulifera Rendle
Myrica pringlei Greenm.
Myrica pubescens Humb. & Bonpl. ex Willd.
Myrica punctata Griseb.
Myrica quercifolia L.
Myrica rotundata Steyerm. & Maguire
Myrica rubra Siebold & Zucc. – yang mei, Chinese bayberry, yumberry
Myrica salicifolia Hochst. ex A.Rich.
Myrica serrata Lam.
Myrica shaferi Urb. & Britton
Myrica singularis Parra-Os.
Myrica spathulata Mirb.

Species names with uncertain taxonomic status
The status of the following species and hybrids is unresolved:

 Morella × macfarlanei (Youngken) Kartesz
 Morella pumila Small
 Myrica aethiopica L.
 Myrica alaternoides Crantz
 Myrica algarbiensis Gand.
 Myrica altera C.DC.
 Myrica apiculata Urb. & Ekman
 Myrica arabica Willd.
 Myrica auriculata Ridl.
 Myrica australasica F.Muell.
 Myrica banksiifolia J.C.Wendl.
 Myrica bojeriana Baker
 Myrica × burbankii A.Chev.
 Myrica burmannii E. Mey. ex C. Dc.
 Myrica capensis Steud.
 Myrica carolenensis A.Rich.
 Myrica caroliniana Ettingsh.
 Myrica conifera Burm.f.
 Myrica domingana C.DC.
 Myrica dregeana A.Chev.
 Myrica elliptica A.Chev.
 Myrica esquirolii H.Lév.
 Myrica fallax DC.
 Myrica florida Regel
 Myrica fuscata Raf.
 Myrica glabrissima A.Chev.
 Myrica hirsuta Mill.
 Myrica holtzii Engl. & Brehmer
 Myrica humbertii Staner & Lebrun
 Myrica ilicifolia Burm.f.
 Myrica jamaicensis R.A.Howard & Proctor
 Myrica laciniata Willd.
 Myrica latiloba Heer
 Myrica lobbii Teijsm. & Binn. ex Miq.
 Myrica longifolia Teijsm. & Binn. ex C.DC.
 Myrica macrophylla Mirb.
 Myrica microcarpa Benth.
 Myrica microstachya Krug & Urb.
 Myrica montana Vahl
 Myrica mossii Burtt Davy
 Myrica myrtifolia A.Chev.
 Myrica nagi Thunb.
 Myrica natalensis C.DC.
 Myrica oligadenia Peter
 Myrica ovata H.L.Wendl.
 Myrica pusilla Raf.
 Myrica reticulata Krug & Urb.
 Myrica rivas-martinezii A.Santos
 Myrica rogersii Burtt Davy
 Myrica roraimae Oliv.
 Myrica rothmaleriana P.Silva
 Myrica rotundifolia Salisb.
 Myrica tomentosa Asch. & Graebn.
 Myrica trifoliata Turpin
 Myrica trifoliata L.
 Myrica trifoliolata DC.
 Myrica undulata Raf.
 Myrica usambarensis Engl.
 Myrica verrucosa Raf.
 Myrica vidaliana Rolfe

Formerly placed here
Balakata luzonica (as M. luzonica S.Vidal)
Comptonia peregrina (L.) J.M.Coult. (as M. aspleniifolia L.)
Nageia nagi (Thunb.) Kuntze (as M. nagi Thunb.)

References

External links

Flora Europaea: Myrica
Flora of China: Myrica
Flora of North America: Myrica
Trees and shrubs of Ecuador: Myrica
Flora of Azores: Myrica
Flora of Nepal: Kaphal
Monograph on the medicinal and clinical uses of Myrica cerifera

 
Fagales genera
Dioecious plants